The Wild Places is a book by British writer Robert Macfarlane published in 2007 about the author's journey to explore and document the remaining wilderness of the British Isles.  The book is separated into 15 chapters, each a description of Macfarlane's journey to a particular type of wild place, such as "Island", "Valley", and "Moor".

References

British travel books
2007 non-fiction books
English non-fiction books
Books about the United Kingdom